Chemonie Plantation was a forced-labor farm of  in northern Leon County, Florida, United States established by Hector Braden. By 1860, 64 enslaved people worked the land, which was primarily used to produce cotton as a cash crop.

Location
Chemonie Plantion was situated on two separate tracts of land. The first tract was located between Centerville Road and the Monticello Road occupying a large amount of land. The second tract was south and slightly east. It was on the Leon County/Jefferson County line.

Adjacent plantations:
Evergreen Hills Plantation to the west 
Tuscawilla Plantation to the north.

The owners
Hector Braden.
In 1811, George Noble Jones was born to Noble Wimberly Jones and Sarah (Fenwick) Jones. Jones was from a long line of wealthy colonial men. His forefather, Noble Jones established Wormsloe Plantation near Savannah, Georgia. On May 18, 1840, Noble married Mary Savage Nuttall and purchased Chemonie as well as the Nuttall's El Destino Plantation. He spent the summer months at his Kingscote Mansion in Newport, Rhode Island, until the Civil War.

Plantation statistics
The Leon County Florida 1860 Agricultural Census shows that the Chemonie Plantation had the following:
Improved Land: 
Unimproved Land: 
Cash value of plantation: $18,400
Cash value of farm implements/machinery: $1300
Cash value of farm animals: $2,608
Number of enslaved persons: 64
Bushels of corn: 5000
Bales of cotton: 200

20th century 
Around 1945, David S. Ingalls, a director of Pan Am World Airways and publisher of Cincinnati Times-Star with Robert Livingston Ireland, Jr. an executive with M.A. Hanna Company, a coal company, purchased Chemonie Plantation, a quail hunting plantation, which became part of the Ireland-Ingalls ownership, a joint business concern. Aside from quail, Chemonie shared  of land in corn production.

References

Rootsweb Plantations
Largest Slaveholders from 1860 Slave Census Schedules
FL Historical Society
Paisley, Clifton; From Cotton To Quail, University of Florida Press, c1968.

External links
Jones, George Noble. Births and Deaths on Chemonie Plantation, 1851, FL
Jones, George Noble. List of Slaves on Chemonie Plantation Who Received Clothing in 1851, FL
Jones, George Noble, Slaves on Chemonie Plantation, 1852, in Family Groups, FL
Jones, George Noble. List of Slaves on El Destino Plantation in 1847, in Family Groups, FL
Jones, George Noble. Slaves Sold to Joseph Bryan, 1860, FL

Plantations in Leon County, Florida
Cotton plantations in Florida